Fernando Romero Havaux (born 11 October 1971) is a Mexican businessman, design curator, and architect. He is the founder of fr·ee and Archivo Diseño y Arquitectura. He was the son-in-law of Mexican billionaire, Carlos Slim.

Background
Fernando Romero is the great grandson of Alejandro Romero Lesbros, who was a pioneer in the development of several boroughs and recreation districts in Mexico City from the 1920s to the 1940s. His grandfather Raúl Romero Erazo and father Raúl Romero Zenizo continued the family business. He studied architecture at Universidad Iberoamericana in Mexico City from 1991 until 1995, serving as a president of the alumni society. 

In 2012, Romero lectured as a visiting professor at Columbia University in New York City. He is a member of the American Institute of Architects and CAMSAM (Mexican Chamber of Architects).

Early career

In 1995, following graduation, Romero joined the office of Rem Koolhaas, Office for Metropolitan Architecture (OMA), in Rotterdam, Netherlands. In 1999, Romero served as the project leader who won the entry for Casa da Música in Porto, Portugal. After its inauguration in 2005, The New York Times described the building as "one of the most important concert halls built in the last 100 years".

fr·ee
Romero founded fr·ee in Mexico City in 2000. Its work comprises a variety of scales, programs and morphologies located all over the world.

Over the past decade, the accolades of Romero and fr·ee have included: 

In 2010, fr·ee formed a separate office in New York City to serve a growing number of cultural, religious, and commercial projects across the United States.

Distinctions
Romero has been awarded with numerous international and national distinctions, such as:  

Honorary Fellowship (2015) by American Institute of Architects; 
Americas Property Award (2012); 
50 Creative Pioneers in (2012) by Fast Company; 
2004 Bauhaus international award in Germany.

Architectural Projects

G-20 Convention Center
The Convention Center, located in Los Cabos, Mexico, was designed by fr·ee to host the 2012 G-20 Los Cabos summit. It has a capacity of 6,500 people and an area of 5,400 square meters. It is set for conferences, exhibitions, festivals and other events and was built in less than seven months. One of the features is the green wall found in its structure, which is the largest in the world with an area of 2,700 square meters.

Soumaya Museum 
The Soumaya Museum, located in Nuevo Polanco in Mexico City, was designed under the direction of Romero in 2010. It has an area of 22,000 square meters and exhibits about 70,000 objects from different collections from the 15th century until the 20th century. The exterior facade is composed of sixteen thousand hexagonal tiles, which generate a different effect depending on the angle at which you are standing. The internal structure is composed of a ramp with 6 floors, each with a specific theme. In October 2015, the number of visitors reached 5 million, the most visited private museum in the world.

New Mexico City international airport (NAICM) 
The proposed new Mexico City airport was designed in collaboration between fr·ee and Foster + Partners. This project was cancelled by the administration of Andrés Manuel López Obrador. It would have had an area of 743,000 square meters. Arup would have been the engineer on the project and performed original masterplan.
The terminal would have used very little power, and would have been the most sustainable airport in the world. It would have had short spaces throughout the halls; therefore, no internal trains or subway tunnels would be used. It would have had six lanes, and would have been able to mobilize up to 120 million passengers per year.
It is estimated that the project would have required an investment of about 9,150 million dollars and is considered to be the most important work of the administration of the president Enrique Peña Nieto.

Others Projects

Eco Museum, Mexico City  (2006-2007), described by Fernanda Canales in her book "Mexican architecture: 1900-2010" as a project that allows an association between the architecture with the general culture.
General Offices Inbursa, Mexico City (2001-2003).
Cervantes Tower: residential complex, Mexico City (2009-2010)
Teahouse, Jinhua, China (2004-2006), considered a project that placed Mexican architecture within the architectural platform that seemed unattainable to Mexico a few years ago. The masterplan was designed by Herzog & de Meuron, and the initiative goes back to Chinese artist Ai Weiwei.
Plaza Carso, Mexico City (2005-2017)

Initiatives
Romero and fr·ee are involved in a wide range of educational and cultural activities. Regeneration, a project restoring selected pieces of modern Mexican architecture, preserves culture and creates awareness about the role of architecture and design in Mexico; Archivo Diseño y Arquitectura, located in Mexico City, situates a private collection and experimental exhibition space for industrial design objects; and "fr·ee time" is a year-long fellowship bestowed upon a Mexican architect under the age of 35, providing an opportunity to travel and research a specific topic in depth.

Books
Books by Romero:
 FR-EE, Mapas (Mexico City, 2013)
 You Are The Context (New York, 2012)
 Simplexity, Hatje Cantz (Germany, 2010)
 Hyperborder; Princeton Architectural Press (New York, 2007): A research into one of the most active borders in the world: Mexico-USA 
 The Air Is Blue (Mexico City, 2007): In homage to Luis Barragán, an exposition curated by Hans Ulrich Obrist and Pedro Reyes (Artist), with 30 contemporary artists
 Translation, ACTAR Editorial (Barcelona, 2005)
 ZMVM (Mexico City, 2000): An analysis of Mexico City’s urban transformation

References

Slim family
1971 births
Living people
Mexican architects
Mexican educators
Mexican philanthropists
Urban designers
Writers from Mexico City